Grigory R. (Григорий Р. in Russian, sometimes marketed in the United States as Rasputin) is a Russian television eight-episode historical drama short series focusing on Grigory Rasputin, created by Ilya Tilkin and Eduard Volodarsky, directed by Andrei Malyukov.

Plot

After the 1917 February Revolution, the Russian Provisional Government established a state commission to investigate the circumstances of Grigory Rasputin's death aiming at the vilification of his political activities, way of life and public presentation of his influence on the imperial family and its entourage, as that of an evil criminal. At the center of the plot is (fictional) detective Heinrich Switten, to whom Chairman Kerensky asks to collect every possible information about the life of the starets, or "spiritual holy man", from his youth in the village of Pokrovskoye, through his rise to fame and power -excessive, in the eyes of many courtiers- by means of his natural gift in faith healing and foretelling, until that December 1916 night, in which Rasputin was assassinated.

Production

Ilya Tilkin wrote the script based on materials collected by Eduard Volodarsky. Director Andrei Malyukov began to work on the film, after having secured Vladimir Mashkov as a protagonist.

Most of the shooting took place in St. Petersburg and the surrounding area. The filming of the film about Rasputin was not welcomed by the official orthodox church, as Rasputin is a figure with a controversial reputation. Therefore, the filming team was not allowed to work in existing churches. As a result, many scenes were shot at the Antoniev Monastery in Novgorod a former church, now a museum. In the Yusupov Palace, where the conspirators killed Rasputin, now there is a Wax Museum, so the decorations of the palace were built at the "Lenfilm" film studio. The decorations of the tsar's wagon were also created there.

Vladimir Mashkov grew his hair for shooting, but his beard is artificial, made with special technology. In total, 5 wigs, 150 beards and about 300 moustaches were made for the film. Costume designer Tatiana Patrahaltseva found several antiques - a jacket and coat, worn by Mashkov. For the main characters - the royal family, Vyrubova, Rasputin, Swietten - all costumes were custom-made. In England, hard collars were ordered, several cylinders and canoes were bought, built according to the technologies of the time. French laces were created from historical designs.

The entire series in on YouTube, Russian-spoken, with English subtitles. Its IMDb ID is 4121340. It is also streamed in the U.S. by Amazon Prime where it received several very positive reviews

Cast

Artistic and production team
 Scenarists - Ilya Tilkin, Eduard Volodarsky
 Director - Andrey Malyukov
 Operators - Alexei Fedorov, Vladimir Klimov
 Soundtrack composers - Ivan Burlyaev, Maxim Koshevarov
 Set designers - Vladimir Svetozarov, Marina Nikolaeva
 Costume Designer - Tatiana Patrahaltseva
 Makeup artist - Evgenia Malinkovskaya
 Producers - Elena Denisevich, Aram Movsesyan, Ruben Disdishian (Executive)

Awards and nominations
 won Professional prize of the Association of Film and Television Producers in the field of television
 won Best Actor in a TV movie/series (Vladimir Mashkov)
 won prize in the category "Best Work of a Production Designer" (Vladimir Svetozarov, Marina Nikolaeva)
 won prize in the category "Best Makeup Artist" (Eugene Malinkovskaya
 nominated best costume designer (Tatiana Patrakhaltseva)

External links

References 

2014 Russian television series debuts
Russian television miniseries
Russia-1 original programming